Mouzo is a surname. Notable people with the surname include:

Roberto Mouzo (born 1953), Argentine footballer
Federico Fattori Mouzo (born 1992), Argentine footballer

See also
Mozo (surname)
Mouzon (disambiguation)